Eridadi Mukwanga (12 July 1943 – January 1998) was a Ugandan boxer, silver medalist at the 1968 Summer Olympics in Mexico City.

He was the first athlete representing Uganda to win an Olympic medal.

Amateur highlights
Bantamweight silver medalist at the 1968 Olympics in Mexico City. Results were:
Defeated Roberto Cervantes (Mexico) points
Defeated Chang Kyou-Chul (Korea) points
Lost to Valerian Sokolov (Soviet Union) TKO-2

References

1943 births
1998 deaths
Bantamweight boxers
Commonwealth Games competitors for Uganda
Boxers at the 1970 British Commonwealth Games
Olympic boxers of Uganda
Olympic silver medalists for Uganda
Boxers at the 1968 Summer Olympics
Olympic medalists in boxing
Ugandan male boxers
Medalists at the 1968 Summer Olympics